was a Japanese dermatologist. In 1923, he first reported crush syndrome while he was studying in Germany. He worked as professor of dermatology at Okayama University and Kyushu University. To stimulate dermatological research among young Japanese dermatologists, he created the Minami Awards.

Life
Minami was born on November 1, 1893 in Hiroshima Prefecture. After graduating from Tokyo University in 1918, he went to Berlin in 1922 to study, where he translated the book World history of syphilis into German under the supervision of Keizo Dohi. He studied pathology under Professor Pick in and published a paper which was the first report on crush syndrome. Later he helped Otto Heinrich Warburg to obtain the Nobel Prize for physiology and medicine.

In 1924, Minami became Professor of Dermatology at Okayama University and, in 1931, Professor of Dermatology at Kyushu University. He retired in 1948 and founded the Minami Syphilis Research Institute and Hospital in Fukuoka. To stimulate dermatology research among young Japanese physicians, he established the Minami Award in 1954, which now consists of a monetary prize presented by the Japanese Dermatological Association. In 1966, he received the best physician award of the Japan Medical Association.

References

See also
Seigo Minami reported Crush syndrome for the first time in the world. Matsuki Akitomo, Masui (Anestheology), 55,2,222-228, 2006. (in Japanese)

Japanese dermatologists
People from Hiroshima Prefecture
1893 births
1975 deaths